Pat Smith may refer to:

Pat Smith (wrestler) (born 1970), former collegiate wrestler and assistant coach
Pat Falken Smith (1926–2001), television writer
Pat Smith (soccer referee) (1923–2010), British-American soccer referee
Cedric C. Smith (1895–1969), known as Pat, American football fullback
Patricia Southall (born 1971), known as Pat Smith, American founder and spokesperson of Treasure You
Pat Smith (rugby league), see Ireland national rugby league team

See also 
Patrick Smith (disambiguation)
Patricia Smith (disambiguation)
Pat Smythe (1928–1996), British showjumper
Pat Smythe (pianist) (1923–1983), jazz pianist
Patrick Smyth (disambiguation)
Patrick Smythe (disambiguation)